Covadonga Harbor is a small extension of the northeast corner of Huon Bay immediately south of Cape Legoupil, Trinity Peninsula. It was named by the Chilean Antarctic Expedition after their ship Covadonga, which first used this anchorage in 1947–48.

References
 

Ports and harbours of Graham Land
Trinity Peninsula